"Hongxian" is a Chinese short story dating back to the Tang dynasty, believed to have been written by either Yuan Jiao or Yang Juyuan. "Hongxian" revolves around a general's maid who strikes fear into the heart of a rival general by infiltrating his bedroom and stealing a golden box.

Plot
The story takes place as the An Lushan Rebellion is waning; the Tang government orders the general Xue Song to lead the Zhaoyi army headquartered in Fuyang, Hebei and take control of Shandong, a hotbed of rebel generals. To strengthen the ties between the various military governors, the government also has Xue Song marry his daughter and son to the son of Weibo governor Tian Chengsi and the daughter of Huazhou governor Linghu Zhang respectively. However, irritated by the Weibo heat, Tian Chengsi decides to annex the cooler Shandong area. 

Distressed by Tian's intentions, Xue confides in his maid named Hongxian, who is also a skilled ruan player and Song's "inner record-keeper". Hongxian tells her master not to worry, before heading out to Tian's territory at midnight to conduct reconnaissance. She returns the next morning and recounts her mission to Xue: having avoided detection by Tian's troops, she snuck into Tian's chambers to find him fast asleep; instead of assassinating him, she stole a golden box next to his bed containing numerous precious items; and before leaving, she bound together some of Tian's sleeping maids by their tops and skirts without awaking them.

Xue Song orders a messenger to return the box to Tian; startled, the Weibo general lavishes many gifts upon Xue and denies having had any intention of annexing his territory. Some time later, Hongxian reveals to her master that in her past life, she was a male healer who accidentally killed a pregnant woman and her unborn twins, and was therefore made to atone in the next life as a woman; having paid her dues, she now wishes to retreat to the mountains. Xue organises a farewell banquet for her and commissions poet Leng Chaoyang to write a poem in her honour.

Authorship and publication history
"Hongxian" is one of the eight chuanqi tales collected in Ganze yao or Ballads of Timely Rainfall by Yuan Jiao. Although most modern scholars believe that Yuan wrote "Hongxian", other commentators, for example E. D. Edwards and Liu Ying have attributed authorship of the story to the eighth-century writer Yang Juyuan. The original Ganze yao was lost during or before the Yuan dynasty, but "Hongxian" was partially preserved in Song dynasty leishu, whose editors had access to the original Ganze yao; the Taiping Guangji was the earliest anthology to feature "Hongxian".

Literary significance
The protagonist Hongxian is an example of the nüxia or "female knight-errant", a common character in mainstream Tang dynasty fiction. According to Sarah M. Allen, "the narrative focuses from the beginning on the woman herself (and) does not portray her as a figure of desire." While described as an intellectually and culturally accomplished lady, Hongxian is "not said to be beautiful", and Xue Song "admires her talents without becoming infatuated with her."

Notes

References

Citations

Bibliography

 
 
 
 

Tang dynasty literature
Short stories set in the Tang dynasty
Short stories set in Hebei
Stories within Taiping Guangji
Short stories set in Shanxi
Fiction set in the 8th century
Wuxia short stories
Short stories adapted into plays